Rajnavy Futsal Club (Thai สโมสรฟุตซอลราชนาวี) is a Thai Futsal club. They currently play in the Thailand Futsal League.

External links 
 Rajnavy Futsal Club

Futsal clubs in Thailand
Futsal clubs established in 2006
2006 establishments in Thailand